Kötüklü is a municipality and village in the Qabala Rayon of Azerbaijan. It has a population of 609.

References

Populated places in Qabala District